The Almonaster Avenue Bridge is a bascule bridge in New Orleans, Louisiana. The bridge has two vehicular lanes of Almonaster Avenue and two railroad tracks over the Industrial Canal.  

The bridge is named after Almonaster Avenue on which it is built. It is one of the first four bridges built by the Port of New Orleans and was completed in 1919 in order to provide railroad access across the Inner Harbor-Navigational Canal, locally referred to as the Industrial Canal. Besides Almonaster Bridge, two of the sister bridges at St. Claude Avenue and Seabrook, remain in service today. 

The bridge also served to re-connect Old Gentilly Road, which had been severed by the construction of the Industrial Canal.  (Almonaster Avenue did not exist at this point.)  Old Gentilly Road was part of the Old Spanish Trail and provided the only vehicular route east out of New Orleans at the time.  U.S. Route 90 was routed over the bridge from 1926 until 1932, when the original Danziger Bridge on the new Chef Menteur Highway was completed to the north.

The Almonaster Bridge provides two vehicular lanes and a single railroad track crossing down the center of the span.

Since Hurricane Katrina destroyed the roadways leading up to it, the bridge now normally stays in the up position, being lowered as needed for rail traffic. The Port of New Orleans, the Regional Planning Commission, and the Louisiana Department of Transportation and Development have an ongoing feasibility study underway for replacing the bridge with a modern structure.

References 

Bridges in New Orleans
Bascule bridges in the United States
Road-rail bridges in the United States
Bridges completed in 1919
Railroad bridges in Louisiana
Road bridges in Louisiana
1919 establishments in Louisiana